The King Salman Center for Disability Research (KSCDR) is a non-profit organization based in Riyadh, Saudi Arabia. It conducts and funds laboratory and field research on all aspects and ages of disability. Its aim is to improve the quality of life of all persons living with disabilities by promoting research that results in real-life changes and activities that help reduce the impact of disability.

History
KSCDR is named in honor of the Custodian of the Two Holy Mosques King Salman bin Abdulaziz Al Saud. It was founded in 1992 by His Royal Highness Prince Sultan bin Salman bin Abdulaziz Al Saud to complement the  Disabled Children Association (DCA), a service-oriented organization for children living with disabilities in Saudi Arabia. It was partially funded by Sheikh Hassan Enany.

Activities

Newborn screening program
In 2005, KSCDR launched the Newborn Screening program in partnership with the Ministry of Health, King Faisal Specialist Hospital and Research Centre, and several MOH affiliated hospitals in Saudi Arabia. The program screens for 16 different types of inherited metabolic and endocrine disorders and averages over 170,000 yearly screenings.

Universal accessibility
In 2010, KSCDR published the Universal Accessibility Guidelines as part of its campaign to introduce the universal accessibility concept in Saudi Arabia.

Learning disability
KSCDR provides in-school training workshops for teachers to help them recognize and teach students with LD.  It collaborates with the Center for Child Evaluation and Teaching in Kuwait and with local and international experts to develop standardized learning disability assessment tools in Arabic.  In 2012, KSCDR forged a partnership with McGraw-Hill Education Services to develop educational programs benefiting students with learning difficulties.

Research
KSCDR is actively pursuing a number of research topics.  These include research in the area of visual impairment, speech impairment, autism, and mental health.

King Salman Award for Disability Research

In December 2010, KSCDR established the King Salman Award for Disability Research to recognize significant contributions and impact made by individuals and/or organizations in the field of disability.

Nominations
Nominations are accepted from local, regional, and international research and scientific organizations, societies and agencies dealing with disabled individuals, and academic departments, faculties, and universities. Nominations from individuals are not accepted.

Areas
The Award is granted in the following three main areas of disability:
 Health and Medical Sciences.
 Pedagogical and Educational Sciences.
 Rehabilitative and Social Sciences.

Value
Awardees in their respective areas receive the following:

 A certificate bearing the name of the winner as well as a summary of the work that earned him/her the Award.
 An honorary medal.
 A sum of five-hundred thousand Saudi Riyals (approximately US$133,450)

Recognitions
KSCDR received the European Union's Chaillot Award in 2011 for its work on protecting the rights of disabled people.

KSCDR is the recipient of the 2011–2012 Sheikh Hamdan bin Rashid Al Maktoum Award for the Best Medical College/Institution or Centre in the Arab World.

List of chief executives 

 Sultan bin Turki Al Sedairy (2004–2019)
 Ola Abusukkar (2019–present)

See also
 List of things named after Saudi Kings

References

1991 establishments in Saudi Arabia
Research institutes established in 1991
Medical research institutes in Saudi Arabia
Disability rights organizations
Organisations based in Riyadh
Disability in Saudi Arabia